Gurtej Singh (born 15 October 1959) is an Indian athlete. He competed in the men's javelin throw at the 1984 Summer Olympics.

References

External links
 

1959 births
Living people
Athletes (track and field) at the 1984 Summer Olympics
Indian male javelin throwers
Olympic athletes of India
Place of birth missing (living people)
Asian Games medalists in athletics (track and field)
Asian Games bronze medalists for India
Athletes (track and field) at the 1982 Asian Games
Medalists at the 1982 Asian Games